Events in 1928 in animation.

Films released
5 January – Short Circuit (United States)
8 January – The Smoke Scream (United States)
14 January – Pig Styles (United States)
22 January – Draggin' th' Dragon (United States)
28 January – Shadow Theory (United States)
5 February – The Oily Bird  (United States)
11 February –Ice Boxed (United States)
19 February – Ohm Sweet Ohm (United States)
20 February – Africa Before Dark (United States)
25 February – A Hunger Stroke (United States)
4 March – Japanicky (United States)
10 March – Wired and Fired (United States)
18 March –Polly-tics (United States)
19 March – Bright Lights (United States)
24 March – Love Sunk (United States)
1 April – Comicalamities (United States)
7 April – Tong Tied (United States)
15 April – Felix the Cat in Sure-Locked Homes view (United States)
19 April – Eskimotive (United States)
21 April – A Bum Steer (United States)
5 May – Gold Bricks (United States)
13 May – Arabiantics (United States)
14 May – Hungry Hoboes (United States)
15 May – Plane Crazy (United States)
19 May – The Long Count (United States)
27 May – In- and Out-Laws (United States)
28 May – Oh What a Knight (United States)
2 June – The Patent Medicine Kid (United States)
10 June – Outdoor Indore (United States)
11 June – Poor Papa (United States)
16 June – Stage Coached (United States)
24 June: 
The Fox Chase (United States)
Futuritzy (United States)
The Mouse's Bride (United States)
30 June – The Rain Dropper (United States)
8 July – Astronomeows (a.k.a. Astronomeous) (United States)
9 July – Tall Timber (United States)
14 July: 
 Ghosts Before Breakfast (Germany)
 A Companionate Mirage (United States)
22 July – Jungle Bungles (United States)
4 August: 
News Reeling (United States)
Static (United States)
5 August – The Last Life (United States)
16 August – Baby Feud (United States)
26 August – In the Bag (United States)
5 September – Sea Sword (United States)
15 September – The Show Vote (United States)
18 September – Sunday on the Farm (United States)
29 September – The Phantom Trail (United States)
14 October – Dinner Time (United States)
15 October – Come Easy, Go Slow (United States)
29 October – Beaches and Scream (United States)
4 November – Animal Olympic Games (Japan) 
9 November – Nicked Nags (United States)
18 November – Steamboat Willie (United States)
23 November – Liar Bird (United States)
26 November – Barnyard Politics (United States)
7 December – Still Waters (United States)
22 December – Night Owls (United States)
23 December – Stage Struck (United States)
30 December – The Gallopin' Gaucho (United States)

Births

January
 January 5:
 Denise Bryer, British actress (Twizzle in The Adventures of Twizzle, Commander Makara in Star Fleet, Noddy in The Noddy Shop), (d. 2021).
 Joe Harris, American illustrator and storybook artist (creator of the Trix Rabbit, co-creator of Underdog), (d. 2017).
 January 26: Bob Singer, American animation artist, character designer, layout and background artist and storyboard director (Hanna-Barbera).
 January 29: Pierre Tchernia, French producer, screenwriter and animator (Asterix, Lucky Luke), (d. 2016).

February
 February 2: Yugo Sako, Japanese film director, producer and animator (Ramayana: The Legend of Prince Rama), (d. 2012).
 February 11: Conrad Janis, American jazz trombonist and actor (voice of Frederick McConnell in Mork & Mindy/Laverne & Shirley/Fonz Hour), (d. 2022).
 February 15: Norman Bridwell, American author and cartoonist (creator of Clifford the Big Red Dog), (d. 2014).
 February 22: Paul Dooley, American actor, writer and comedian (voice of Sarge in the Cars franchise, Gazooks in Raggedy Ann & Andy: A Musical Adventure, Hank the Janitor/Mall Santa in Recess Christmas: Miracle on Third Street, Father Michael in the Batman: The Animated Series episode "It's Never Too Late", Stan in the Duckman episode "Dammit, Hollywood", Security Guard in the American Dad! episode "Next of Pin").
 February 28: Hoàng Việt, Vietnamese composer and animator, (d. 1967).

March
 March 7: Štěpán Koníček, Czech composer and conductor (Munro, Gene Deitch, Popeye the Sailor, Tom and Jerry, Jan Svankmajer), (d. 2006).
 March 16: Pepita Pardell, Spanish animator, cartoonist, illustrator and painter (worked for Balet y Blay), (d. 2019).
 March 19: Patrick McGoohan, Irish-American actor, director, screenwriter and producer (voice of Billy Bones in Treasure Planet, Number Six in The Simpsons episode "The Computer Wore Menace Shoes"), (d. 2009).
 March 20:
 Fred Rogers, American television host, author, producer and minister (voiced himself in the Arthur episode "Arthur Meets Mister Rogers"), (d. 2003).
 Eddy Ryssack, Belgian comics artist and animator (worked for Belvision), (d. 2004).

April
 April 5: Gene Merlino, American retired singer and musician (choir performer in Charlotte's Web and Heidi's Song, performed the songs "South of the Border", "Born Free" and "Jellyfish" in The Simpsons, additional voices in The Little Mermaid).
 April 7: James Garner, American actor (voice of God in God, the Devil and Bob, Rourke in Atlantis: The Lost Empire, Shazam in Superman/Shazam!: The Return of Black Adam), (d. 2014).
 April 22: Estelle Harris, American actress and comedian (voice of Mrs. Tammy Turtle in Mickey Mouse Works and House of Mouse, Mrs. Potato Head in the Toy Story franchise, Mrs. Catherina Duckstein in Queer Duck, Old Lady Bear in Brother Bear, Mrs. June Boogin in Teacher's Pet, Audrey in Home on the Range, Mama Lipsky in Kim Possible, Lula in Dave the Barbarian, Mama Gunda in Tarzan II, Oz's Mother in Fanboy & Chum Chum, Peg-Leg Peg in Jake and the Never Land Pirates, Velma Farnsworth in the Futurama episode "Near-Death Wish", Death's Mother in the Family Guy episode "Death Lives", Timon's Mother in the Timon & Pumbaa episode "Mombasa-In-Law", Lt. Kellaway's Mother in The Mask episode "The Mother of All Hoods", Arthur's Mother in The Tick episode "The Tick vs. Dot and Neil's Wedding", Phil's Mother in the Hercules episode "Hercules and the King for a Day", Iguana and Turtle in The Wild Thornberrys episode "Eliza-cology", Old Lady and Receptionist in the Godzilla: The Series episode "What Dreams May Come", Helga in The Proud Family episode "Thelma and Luis", Mrs. Irma Mudka in The Emperor's New School episode "Mudka's Secret Recipe", Marty's Wife in the American Dad! episode "In Country... Club", Sylvester's Mother in The Looney Tunes Show episode "Point, Laser Point"), (d. 2022).

May
 May 1: Raoul Servais, Belgian animator, animated film director and comic artist (Chromophobia, Harpya), (d. 2023).
 May 8: John Bennett, British actor (Captain Holly in Watership Down, Don in The Plague Dogs), (d. 2005).

June
 June 2: Bob Amsberry, American actor (voiced one of Maleficent's goons in Sleeping Beauty), (d. 1957).
 June 9: Jackie Mason, American comedian and actor (voice of Rabbi Hyman Krustofski in The Simpsons, The Sandman in The Fairly OddParents episode "Beddy Bye"), (d. 2021).
 June 12: Richard M. Sherman, American songwriter (Walt Disney Animation Studios, Snoopy Come Home, Charlotte's Web, The Mighty Kong).
 June 16: Annie Cordy, Belgian singer, comedian and actress (dub voice of Grandmother Willow in Pocahontas), (d. 2020).
 June 20: Martin Landau, American actor, acting coach, producer and editorial cartoonist (voice of Mac Gargan/Scorpion in Spider-Man, #2 in 9, Mr. Rzykruski in Frankenweenie, The Great Raymondo in The Simpsons episode "The Great Simpsina"), (d. 2017).
 June 25:
 Alex Toth, American comics artist and animator (Space Ghost), (d. 2006).
 Peyo, Belgian comics artist and film director (The Smurfs and the Magic Flute), (d. 1992).

July
 July 13: Johnny Gilbert, American announcer (voice of Jackie Jacques in the Johnny Bravo episode "Over the Hump!", TV Host in The Angry Beavers episode "Stare and Stare Alike!", himself in the Scooby-Doo and Guess Who? episode "Total Jeopardy!").
 July 17: Vince Guaraldi, American jazz composer (Peanuts), (d. 1976).
 July 22: Orson Bean, American actor (voice of Bilbo Baggins in The Hobbit, Frodo Baggins in The Return of the King, Billy Rabbit in Garfield in the Rough, and Geppetto in the Tiny Toon Adventures episode "Fairy Tales for the 90's"), (d. 2020).

August
 August 7: Romeo Muller, American screenwriter (Rankin/Bass), (d. 1992).
 August 9: Malcolm Marmorstein, American film director and screenwriter (Pete's Dragon), (d. 2020).
 August 19: Walter Massey, Canadian actor (voice of Admiral Zogal and Deathforce Officer in Space Carrier Blue Noah, Captain Perez and The Doctor in The Mysterious Cities of Gold, Papa and Dr. Nose in Adventures of the Little Koala, Uncle Henry in The Wonderful Wizard of Oz, Polluto in The Smoggies, Plato in The Little Flying Bears, Geppetto in Saban's Adventures of Pinocchio, Piers McMaster in C.L.Y.D.E., Guru Lou in Samurai Pizza Cats, Papa Beaver in Papa Beaver's Storytime, Mr. Gronkle in The Busy World of Richard Scarry, Dentist in The Little Lulu Show, Principal Herbert Haney and Mr. Marco in Arthur, Mr. Tinker in How the Toys Saved Christmas, Dr. Stewart in Lassie, Shen-Shen's Great Great Uncle in the Sagwa, the Chinese Siamese Cat episode "Wedding Day Mess", Santa Claus in Caillou's Holiday Movie, additional voices in Diplodos, Bumpety Boo, Sharky and George, The Adventures of Peter Pan, Saban's Adventures of the Little Mermaid, Bob in a Bottle, Robinson Sucroe, Animal Crackers, The Country Mouse and the City Mouse Adventures, Caillou, Patrol 03, Ripley's Believe It or Not!, For Better or For Worse, A Miss Mallard Mystery, Wunschpunsch and Tripping the Rift), (d. 2014).
 August 31: James Coburn, American actor (voice of Henry J. Waternoose III in Monsters, Inc.), (d. 2002).

September
 September 4: Dick York, American actor (voice of Darrin Stephens in The Flintstones episode "Samantha"), (d. 1992).
 September 17: Roddy McDowall, American actor (voice of Mad Hatter in the DC Animated Universe, Proteus in Gargoyles, the Breadmaster in The Tick, Snowball in Pinky and the Brain, Mr. Soil in A Bug's Life), (d. 1998).
 September 19: Adam West, American actor (voice of Batman in The New Adventures of Batman, Tarzan and the Super 7, Super Friends: The Legendary Super Powers Show, The Super Powers Team: Galactic Guardians, The Simpsons episode "Large Marge", Batman: New Times, Batman: Return of the Caped Crusaders and Batman vs. Two-Face, Dog Zero and Leonardo da Vinci in The Secret Files of the Spy Dogs, Mayor Adam West in Family Guy, Catman in The Fairly OddParents, Mayor Grange in The Batman, Jared Moon in Aloha, Scooby-Doo!, Ace in Chicken Little, Uncle Art in Meet the Robinsons, Thomas Wayne and Proto-Bot in Batman: The Brave and the Bold, Wise Old Parrot in Jake and the Never Land Pirates, Captain Super Captain and Professor Evil Professor in Penn Zero: Part-Time Hero, Simon Trent in the Batman: The Animated Series episode "Beware the Gray Ghost", Captain Blasto in the Rugrats episode "Superhero Chuckie", Spruce Wayne/Caped Crusader in the Animaniacs episode "Boo Wonder", Ernest Hemingway in the Histeria! episode "Super Writers", Timothy North/Fearless Ferret in the Kim Possible episode "The Fearless Ferret", R. Kelly's Lawyer in The Boondocks episode "The Trail of Robert Kelly", young Mermaid Man in the SpongeBob SquarePants episode "Back to the Past", Nighthawk in The Super Hero Squad Show episode "Whom Continuity Would Destroy!", Razzle Novak in the Moonbeam City episode "Stuntstravaganza", himself in The Simpsons episode "Mr. Plow", The Critic episode "Eyes on the Prize", the Johnny Bravo episodes "Johnny Bravo Meets Adam West" and "Adam West Date-O-Rama", The Fairly OddParents episodes "Miss Dimmsdale" and "Channel Chasers", and the Futurama episode "Leela and the Genestalk"), (d. 2017).
 September 28: Koko Taylor, American singer (voiced herself in the Arthur episode "Big Horns George"), (d. 2009).

October
 October 1: Erica Yohn, American actress (voice of Mama Mousekewitz in An American Tail), (d. 2019).
 October 2: Ted Nichols, American composer and educator (Scooby-Doo, Where Are You!).
 October 5: Ray Osrin, American cartoonist, animator and comics artist, (d. 2001).
 October 9: Jim MacGeorge, American actor (voice of Captain Huffenpuff, Beany Boy and Crowy in Beany and Cecil, Oliver Hardy in Laurel & Hardy), (d. 2021).
 October 19: Lou Scheimer, American animation producer (founder of Filmation), actor (voice of Dumb Donald in Fat Albert and the Cosby Kids, Orko and Stratos in He-Man and the Masters of the Universe) and composer (He-Man and the Masters of the Universe), (d. 2013).
 October 25: Marion Ross, American actress (voice of Grandma SquarePants in SpongeBob SquarePants, Mrs. Lopart in Handy Manny, Mrs. von Hausen in The Boondocks, Marion Cunningham in the Family Guy episode "The Father, the Son, and the Holy Fonz", General Richter in the Superman: The Animated Series episode "Speed Demons", Ms. Wakefield in the King of the Hill episode of the same name, Flavia in The Sylvester & Tweety Mysteries episode "Jeepers Creepers", Grandma Moonbeam in the Scooby-Doo! Mystery Incorporated episode "When the Cicada Calls", Rebecca the Elephant Queen in The Wild Thornberrys episode "Forget Me Not", Doctor Minerva in the Guardians of the Galaxy episode "Gotta Get Outta This Place").

November
 November 3: Osamu Tezuka, Japanese manga artist and animator (Astro Boy, Kimba the White Lion, Black Jack, Phoenix, Princess Knight, Unico, Message to Adolf, The Amazing 3, Buddha), (d. 1989).
 November 10: Ennio Morricone, Italian composer (Around the World with Peynet's Lovers, Aida of the Trees), (d. 2020).
 November 16: Clu Gulager, American actor and director (voice of Anderson's War Buddy in the Beavis and Butt-Head episode "What's the Deal?"), (d. 2022).
 November 17: Eli Bauer, American comics artist and animator (Terrytoons, Sesame Street), (d. 1998).
 November 23: Elmarie Wendel, American actress and singer (voice of Aunt Grizelda in The Lorax, Beverley Billingsley in the American Dad episode "Stanny Boy and Frantastic"), (d. 2018).

December
 December 1: Malachi Throne, American actor (voice of God in Animaniacs, Mongke in Avatar: The Last Airbender, Ranakar in Green Lantern: First Flight, Fingers in the Batman Beyond episode "Speak No Evil", The Judge in The New Batman Adventures episode "Judgement Day"), (d. 2013).
 December 10: John Colicos, Canadian actor (voice of Apocalypse in X-Men), (d. 2000).
 December 11: Peter Firmin, British animator, puppeteer and illustrator (co-creator of Noggin the Nog, Ivor the Engine and Bagpuss), co-founder of Smallfilms, (d. 2018).
 December 14: Nikolay Serebryakov, Soviet and Russian director of animated films, (d. 2005).
 December 17:
 George Lindsey, American actor (voice of Lafayette in The Aristocats, Trigger in Robin Hood, Deadeye in The Rescuers), (d. 2012).
 Whitney Lee Savage, American animator (Mickey Mouse in Vietnam, Sesame Street), (d. 1998).
 December 25: Dick Miller, American actor (voice of Boxy Bennett in Batman: The Animated Series, Chuckie Sol in Batman: Mask of the Phantasm, Oberon in the Justice League Unlimited episode "The Ties That Bind"), (d. 2019).
 December 28: Bob Holt, American actor (voice of the title character and the Once-ler in The Lorax, Avatar in Wizards, the title characters in The Great Grape Ape Show and The Incredible Hulk, Shadow Demon in Dungeons & Dragons, Cop-Tur in Challenge of the GoBots), (d. 1985).
 December 29: Bernard Cribbins, English actor and singer (portrayed Mr. Masterman in The Water Babies, voice of the Narrator in The Wombles, Christopher's Christmas Mission, Simon in the Land of Chalk Drawings and Edward and Friends, Eel in The Water Babies, Clint Katzenburger in the Dennis and Gnasher episode "Oil Strike!"), (d. 2022).

References

External links 
Animated works of the year, listed in the IMDb